A. K. Bose (1949–2018) was an Indian politician and  member of the Tamil Nadu Legislative Assembly from the Thirupparankundram Constituency (2006-2011) and again from 2011-2016 from the Madurai North constituency. He represented the All India Anna Dravida Munnetra Kazhagam party.

The elections of 2016 resulted in his constituency being won by V. V. Rajan Chellappa.

He died on 2 August 2018 due to a heart attack.

Elections Contested and Results

References 

1949 births
2018 deaths
People from Madurai
Tamil Nadu MLAs 2011–2016
All India Anna Dravida Munnetra Kazhagam politicians
Tamil Nadu MLAs 2006–2011
Amma Makkal Munnetra Kazhagam politicians